Momo Babungu (born 12 April 1983) is a Congolese table tennis player. He competed in the men's singles event at the 2004 Summer Olympics.

References

1983 births
Living people
Democratic Republic of the Congo male table tennis players
Olympic table tennis players of the Democratic Republic of the Congo
Table tennis players at the 2004 Summer Olympics
Place of birth missing (living people)